Bill Chott (born July 23, 1969) is an American actor and comedian. He is best known for his role as Mr. Laritate on the Disney Channel series Wizards of Waverly Place.

Early life
During his school years, Chott appeared in numerous plays and musicals. He graduated from Ritenour High School, and in 2010 was inducted into their Alumni Hall of Fame. He continued pursuing theater in college at Central Methodist University in Fayette, Missouri, acting in a wide variety of plays. He was also in Chi Delta fraternity while at Central Methodist as well as Phi Mu Alpha Sinfonia's Beta Mu chapter. He left Missouri in 1992, and headed to Chicago, IL where he quickly became involved with improvisational theater at ComedySportz, IO Theater, and the Second City comedy troupe. His contemporaries in the Chicago improv scene included Steve Carell, Stephen Colbert, Tina Fey and Amy Poehler.

Career

Writing
Chott toured the country and in 1995 he made his television debut on The Dana Carvey Show, among a repertory cast that included Stephen Colbert, Steve Carell, and Robert Smigel. His most lasting contribution to the program was as the announcer for The Ambiguously Gay Duo, a series of animated shorts created by Smigel and J.J. Sedelmaier, which continued to be produced by J.J. Sedelmaier Productions for Saturday Night Live after the quick cancellation of "The Dana Carvey Show."

Film
His film roles include performances in Galaxy Quest, Dude Where's My Car, Brainwarp, Dante's Inferno, Wild Girls Gone, Dancing at the Blue Iguana and The Ringer.

Television
His television appearances include Third Rock from the Sun, Freaks and Geeks, Popular, ER, Crossballs, Weekends at the DL, CSI, Wizards of Waverly Place, It's Always Sunny in Philadelphia, She Spies, Young Sheldon, This Is Us, and Monk.

Theater
Lucy fans will recognize him for his award-winning portrayal of Fred Mertz in I Love Lucy Live on Stage.

Chott continues to teach and coach improvisational comedy in both Los Angeles and St. Louis, through his school The Improv Trick.

Filmography

References

External links
 
  theimprovtrick.com
 

1969 births
Living people
20th-century American comedians
20th-century American male actors
21st-century American comedians
21st-century American male actors
American male comedians
American male film actors
American male television actors
American sketch comedians
Central Methodist University alumni
Comedians from Missouri
Male actors from St. Louis